County Meath was a constituency represented in the Irish House of Commons until 1800.

Members of Parliament
 1370 (Dublin): James de la Hyde and John Fitz John
 1370 (Kilkenny): Simon Cusak and John 
 1374  Sir Richard Plunkett
 1378 John Freignes (amerced of 100 marks for non-attendance)
 1560 Sir Christopher Cheevers and Patrick Barnewall of Crickston
 1585  Richard Barnewall of Crickstown and John Netterville of Dowth
 1613 Robert Barnewall of Robertstown and Patrick Hussey,  13th Baron Galtrim
 1634–1635 Nicholas Plunkett and Patrick Hussey, 13th  Baron Galtrim
 1639–1642 Sir Richard Barnewall, 2nd Baronet (expelled) and Nicholas Plunkett (expelled)
 1642–1649 Sir John Temple and Thomas Ashe
 1661 Sir Robert Forth  and Sir Theophilus Jones

1689–1801

Notes

References

Citations

Historic constituencies in County Meath
Constituencies of the Parliament of Ireland (pre-1801)
1800 disestablishments in Ireland
Constituencies disestablished in 1800